Kenneth Young may refer to:

Kenneth Young (physicist) (born 1947), American physicist and professor of physics at the Chinese University of Hong Kong
Kenneth Young (New Zealand composer) (born 1955), New Zealand composer and conductor
Kenneth Young (Scottish composer), Scottish video game audio director, composer, and sound designer
Kenneth Young (born 1985), American child convict, subject of the documentary film 15 to Life: Kenneth's Story
Kenneth Victor Young (1933–2017), was an American painter, educator, and designer.
Kenneth Todd Young, United States Ambassador to Thailand

See also
Ken Young (born 1943), British academic in public policy and early Cold War history
Ken Young (marathoner) (born 1941), American physicist and indoor marathon runner
Kenny Young, American songwriter, producer and environmentalist
Kenny Young (American football), American football linebacker